Giorgia Surina (born 8 March 1975, in Milan) is an Italian television personality known for presenting TRL Italy, the Italian version of Total Request Live broadcast by MTV Italia. She has also starred in some movies, such as Una talpa al bioparco and the TV series RIS Delitti Imperfetti and the third season of Love Bugs.

References

External links

 

1975 births
Living people
Italian television personalities
Italian television actresses
Italian film actresses
Actresses from Milan
VJs (media personalities)
21st-century Italian women